Toyohashi City General Gymnasium is an arena in Toyohashi, Aichi, Japan. It is the home arena of the San-en NeoPhoenix of the B.League, Japan's professional basketball league.

Gallery

References

External links
Toyohashi Sports Park

Basketball venues in Japan
Indoor arenas in Japan
San-en NeoPhoenix
Sports venues in Aichi Prefecture
Venues of the 2026 Asian Games
Sports venues completed in 1989
1989 establishments in Japan
Toyohashi